Andante spianato et grande polonaise brillante in E-flat major, Op. 22, was composed by Frédéric Chopin between 1830 and 1834. The Grande polonaise brillante in E-flat, set for piano and orchestra, was written first, in 1830-31. In 1834, Chopin wrote an Andante spianato in G, for piano solo, which he added to the start of the piece, and joined the two parts with a fanfare-like sequence. The combined work (both orchestrated version and solo piano version) was published in 1836, and was dedicated to Madame d'Este.

Music
The Grande polonaise brillante is a work for piano and orchestra, although the piano part is often played on its own. The Andante spianato (spianato means "even" or "smooth") for solo piano was composed as an introduction to the polonaise after Chopin received a long-awaited invitation to perform in one of Habeneck’s Conservatoire Concerts in Paris. This was the only time Chopin had ever used the term spianato as a description for any of his works.

Chopin’s first work, written at age seven, had been a polonaise. Chopin also used the Polonaise form in his earlier work the Introduction and Polonaise brillante in C major, Op. 3.  The Grande polonaise brillante of 1830–31 was to be the last such he would compose for several years. It preoccupied Chopin in his final months at Warsaw. It was finished at Vienna in 1831.

Movements
Andante spianato in G major
The quiet rippling effects of this introductory section are borne in a gentle 6/8, rounded with a chordal trio, and a more processional 3/4. The serene middle section (in G major) is not a trio, but only a contrasting episode to complement the overall texture of the movement.

Grande polonaise brillante in E-flat major
The polonaise opens in fanfare and moves into an ebullient dance form.

Technical difficulties
The grande polonaise brillante is among Chopin's most technically demanding pieces. Technical aspects include:

 fast descending thirds
 rapid, difficult octave and chord jumps
 trills with thirds
 quick scales
 fast arpeggios in both hands
 broken chords
 use of a wide range on the piano keyboard.

In popular culture
The 2002 film The Pianist concludes with this polonaise.

The song “La Soledad” by pop band Pink Martini begins with an excerpt of the Andante spianato movement and makes use of various melodies from the piece throughout the song.

References

External links
 

Polonaises by Frédéric Chopin
1834 compositions
Concertante works by Frédéric Chopin
Compositions in E-flat major
Music with dedications
Polonaises